The Freehold and Jamesburg Agricultural Railroad was a short-line railroad in New Jersey. The railroad traversed through the Raritan Valley communities of Freehold Borough, Freehold Township, Manalapan Township, Englishtown Borough, Monroe Township, and Jamesburg Borough, en route to Monmouth Junction in South Brunswick Township. Its former right-of-way, along with a portion of the Farmingdale and Squan Village Railroad's right-of-way, has become the Edgar Felix Bikeway and the Freehold right-of-way between Route 537 and Big Brook Park in Marlboro Township has become the Henry Hudson Trail. The section of right of way from Route 537 parallel to Jackson Street and behind the former Karagheusian Rug Mill to the former Central Railroad of New Jersey depot on Jackson Street at Mechanic Street in Freehold Borough has not as of yet been improved to be part of the trail. It is not clear whether this part of the right of way is still owned by New Jersey Transit which owns the rest of the line north into Matawan. The latter has been ‘railbanked’ which means it can be reactivated (if economic conditions warrant.)

History 
The railroad was first chartered on March 12, 1851, and incorporated on March 21, 1851.  By the end of 1851, only $40,000 of bonds were subscribed, so the Camden and Amboy Railroad was given authorization to subscribe $100,000 of additional stock to fund the new railroad. Surveying for the line began on September 8, 1851, grading began on October 19, 1852, and the first track was laid on April 4, 1853. The first section of line was opened on July 18, 1853. The establishment of the Freehold & Jamesburg Agricultural Railroad caused Jamesburg to become a railroad hub. The company was formed as a means to haul marl for fertilizer production.  The headquarters of the railroad was originally in Jamesburg; later it was moved to Camden.

William L. Dayton, who would later serve as a United States Senator, the first Republican nominee for Vice President (in 1856), and as Minister to France, was an attorney for the Freehold and Jamesburg Agricultural Railroad. Dayton had helped in settling land disputes arising from the location of the railroad's right-of-way route passage. In 1866, the community of Dayton in nearby South Brunswick Township was renamed in his honor.

The railroad was reorganized under a special law of New Jersey, on May 21, 1879, when it was incorporated, in which three railroads consolidated to form the company, including the Farmingdale and Squan Village Railroad, the Freehold Marl Company Railroad (which later became the Monmouth County Agricultural Railroad) and Camden and Amboy Rail Road and Transportation Company.

The Allaire family was a major stock holder in the company and James P. Allaire's son, Hal, was on the board of directors.

The railroad line was abandoned after 1932. In 1966, the New Jersey Board of Public Utility Commissioners (PUC) approved the sale of a  portion of the former railroad's right-of-way to Jersey Central Power & Light Company. In 1976, Conrail took over the abandoned railroad line, and operations resumed. The railroad line is known as the Freehold Industrial Track, which occasionally runs freight service between Freehold and Jamesburg.

See also
Raritan River Railroad
Monmouth Ocean Middlesex Line

References

Defunct New Jersey railroads
Railway companies established in 1851
Railway companies disestablished in 1958
Predecessors of the Pennsylvania Railroad
1851 establishments in New Jersey